District 17 of the Oregon State Senate comprises parts of Multnomah and Washington counties. It is currently represented by Democrat Elizabeth Steiner Hayward of Portland.

Election results
District boundaries have changed over time, therefore, senators before 2013 may not represent the same constituency as today. From 1993 until 2003, the district covered parts of the Salem metropolitan area, and from 2003 until 2013 it covered a slightly different area in the Portland metropolitan area.

References

17
Multnomah County, Oregon
Washington County, Oregon